Rodney Creech is a Republican member of the Ohio House of Representatives representing the 40th district. He was elected in 2020, defeating Democrat Amy Cox with 54% of the vote.

References

Morehead State University alumni
Living people
Republican Party members of the Ohio House of Representatives
21st-century American politicians
Year of birth missing (living people)
People from Preble County, Ohio